Tropidurus insulanus is a species of lizard of the Tropiduridae family. It is endemic to Brazil and is known from pockets of savanna within the Amazon rainforest of Pará and Mato Grosso states.

The tail is 1.4–1.5 times SVL. It is oviparous.

References

Tropidurus
Lizards of South America
Reptiles of Brazil
Endemic fauna of Brazil
Taxa named by Miguel Trefaut Rodrigues
Reptiles described in 1987